This is a list of Private Passions episodes from 2005 to 2009. It does not include repeated episodes or compilations.

2005

2006

2007

2008

2009

References

External links

Lists of British radio series episodes